Francesca Rhydderch (born 10 February 1969) is a Welsh novelist and academic. In 2013, her debut novel, The Rice Paper Diaries, was longlisted for the Authors’ Club Best First Novel Award and won the Wales Book of the Year Award 2014 for Fiction. Her short stories have been published in anthologies and magazines and broadcast on BBC Radio 4 and Radio Wales.

Biography
Rhydderch was born in Aberystwyth. She obtained a BA in Modern Languages from Newnham College, Cambridge, and a PhD in English from Aberystwyth University.

Rhydderch worked as the Editorial Assistant at Planet: The Welsh Internationalist, and became Associate Editor of the magazine in 1999. As the recipient of a BBC/Tŷ Newydd bursary in 2010, she attended the creative writing course led by BBC Executive Producer Kate McAll and novelist Patricia Duncker. She was appointed Editor of New Welsh Review in 2002. In 2015, she and Penny Thomas edited the New Welsh Short Stories.

Rhydderch has been a Creative Writing Associate Professor at Swansea University since 2015.

Awards 
 The Rice Paper Diaries was longlisted for the Authors’ Club Best First Novel Award and won the Wales Book of the Year Award 2014 for Fiction.
 The Taxidermist’s Daughter was shortlisted for the BBC National Short Story Award in 2014.
 The Welsh play, Cyfaill, was shortlisted for the Theatre Critics Wales Best Playwright Award 2014.
 In July 2015, Professor Matthew Francis from the Department of English and Creative Writing at Aberystwyth University presented Dr Rhydderch as Fellow.

References 

1969 births
Living people
20th-century Welsh people
20th-century Welsh women
21st-century Welsh educators
21st-century Welsh novelists
21st-century Welsh women writers
21st-century Welsh writers
21st-century women educators
People from Aberystwyth
Alumni of Aberystwyth University
Alumni of Newnham College, Cambridge
Academics of Swansea University
Welsh scholars and academics
Welsh women novelists